Ismail Rama (born 3 November 1935) is an Albanian shooter who competed at the 1972 Summer Olympic Games in the 50 metre rifle prone, he finished 22nd.

References

1935 births
Living people
Albanian male sport shooters
Shooters at the 1972 Summer Olympics
Olympic shooters of Albania
Place of birth missing (living people)